Oleksandr Gonchar is a Ukrainian retired footballer.

Career
Oleksandr Gonchar is a pupil of Boryspil football. Gonchar's first professional club was Borysfen Boryspil, for which he made his debut on July 31, 1997, in the first game after the team returned to the second league. For the next three seasons he was a player of the main team of Boryspil.

In the spring of 2000, Oleksandr Honchar transferred to the Ivano-Frankivsk Prykarpattia Premier League. There, his performances were noticed by the coaches of the youth team, and he was called to its meeting. However, as a member of the youth team, the player did not enter the field. In the summer, Prykarpattia flew to the first league, Borysfen Boryspil left the second league to the first, and Gonchar returned to Borysfen Boryspil.

In the winter off-season of 2000/2001 Oleksandr Honchar transferred to Vorskla. In the Poltava club he immediately became a regular player, but in the spring of 2002 he stopped getting into the starting lineup, playing for the double. In the summer of the same year, the footballer returned to Borisfen for the third time in his career. It was at this time that Borysfen Boryspil achieved the greatest success in its history, having spent two seasons in the major leagues, Gonchar was the main player of that team.

After Borisfen was relegated to the first division in 2005, Gonchar joined Metalist Kharkiv. In the winter off-season, the club decided to terminate the player's contract, and Gonchar moved to Luhansk's Zorya, with which he reached the top league. In the major leagues, Gonchar did not play, having played only 5 games per double, in addition, the club had significant financial problems, and Gonchar left the team.

The player spent the second half of the 2007/2008 season in the second league "Princess" from his native Happy. The following season, Oleksandr Honchar played in the first league for Oleksandriya, and since the summer of 2008 he has played for Poltava. In February 2009, Gonchar was under review at the Uzbekistan Premier League club Kyzylkum (Zarafshan), but he did not join the Uzbek team, remaining in Ukraine. Oleksandr Honchar spent the spring part of the season at the Nafkom Brovary in Brovary, where he was the team's vice-captain. In July 2009 he moved to Nyva Ternopil, for which he played in the first league.

Honours
Zorya Luhansk
 Ukrainian First League: 2005–06

Borysfen Boryspil
 Ukrainian First League: 2002–03
 Ukrainian Second League: 1999–2000

References

External links 
 Oleksandr Gonchar at footballfacts.ru
 Oleksandr Gonchar at allplayers.in.ua

1980 births
Living people
FC Desna Chernihiv players
Ukrainian footballers
Ukrainian Premier League players
Ukrainian First League players
Ukrainian Second League players
Ukrainian expatriate sportspeople in Kazakhstan
Expatriate footballers in Kazakhstan
Association football midfielders